Krông Năng is a township and capital of Krông Năng District, Đắk Lắk Province, Vietnam.

References

Communes of Đắk Lắk province
Populated places in Đắk Lắk province
District capitals in Vietnam
Townships in Vietnam